Sigma Iota Epsilon is a National Honorary and Professional Management Fraternity.

Purpose
The stated goals of Sigma Iota Epsilon are;

To stimulate interest and achievement in the field of management;
To stimulate scholarship in management;
To facilitate contacts between students and practicing managers;
To recognize persons who have made contributions to the field of management;
To gain recognition of the contribution and value of scholastic achievement in the management discipline;
To promote scholarship

History
Rather than founding members, it was formed as a merger of three local industrial management and general management fraternities located at the University of Illinois, Syracuse University, and the University of Texas. The Society notes that sponsoring professors A.G. Anderson at Illinois, Maurice C. Cross at Syracuse and Chester F. Lay at Texas coordinated the merger of the local societies they led.  

More recently, the society has adopted aspects of both an honor society and a professional fraternity.

As of the 19th edition of Baird's Manual, a total of 33 active chapters and 7 inactive chapters was reported, with approximately 7,500 initiates.  The Society has grown since then to include 73 active chapters.

Membership
Membership into Sigma Iota Epsilon is extended to those students who have high academic standing and have demonstrated an interest in management or a management-related area (marketing, sports management, hotel and restaurant management, finance, accounting, CIS, etc).

Undergraduate students must meet the following criteria:

 Hold at least a cumulative 3.25 GPA (in a system where “A” is 4.0).
 Have completed at least one year or 30 semester hours at the institution where the chapter is located.
 Have completed a minimum of one management course with a grade of “B” or better.
 Have stated their interest in continuing in a management or other related curriculum by taking at least one more management course.

Graduate students must meet the following criteria:

 Hold at least a cumulative 3.50 GPA (in a system where “A” is 4.0).
 Have completed at least one year or 30 semester hours at the institution where the chapter is located.
 Have completed a minimum of one management course with a grade of “B” or better.
 Have stated their interest in continuing in the management or related curriculum by taking at least one more management course.

Chapters
Sigma Iota Epsilon chapters are located in the United States and India.

See also

 Professional fraternities and sororities

References

Professional fraternities and sororities in the United States
Student organizations established in 1927
1927 establishments in Illinois